Richard Cecil Denis Compton (born 29 March 1956) is a retired South African cricketer.

Compton was the third son of the English Test cricketer Denis Compton, Denis's second son with his second wife Valerie Platt. He was born in London and brought up in South Africa from 1960.

A right-handed batsman and right-arm fast-medium bowler, he represented Natal in seven first-class matches in the Howa Bowl, five in 1978/79 and two in 1980/81. He scored 99 runs at an average of 9.00 and took eighteen wickets at an average of 22.11, with best bowling figures of 3/42 in the first innings against Western Province in February 1979.

His brother Patrick also played first-class cricket for Natal, and his uncle Leslie, Denis's brother, played for Middlesex (and for Arsenal and England at football).

His son Nick captained Harrow in 2001, played first-class cricket for Middlesex (2001–2010 and 2015 to 2018) and Somerset (2010–2014). Nick made his test debut for England in 2012 against India.

References

External links

1956 births
Living people
KwaZulu-Natal cricketers
South African cricketers
South African people of English descent